Christopher Taylor (born 31 May 1966) is a former Australian rules footballer who played for the Fitzroy Football Club in the Victorian Football League (VFL). He played one game in the 1987 season, but was delisted at the end of the season.

Game

Taylor played against Essendon in Round 20 of the 1987 season, but was dropped from the squad in the next game.

References

1966 births
Living people
Fitzroy Football Club players
Australian rules footballers from Victoria (Australia)